The London Transit Commission (LTC) is responsible for the operation of the public transit system on behalf of the City of London, Ontario, Canada. It operates transit bus service and para-transit service. In 2014, annual ridership totaled 24.1 million. The LTC has 27 regular bus routes, six express routes, three school-year-only routes and six community bus routes.

History

London Street Railway
London Street Railway Company (LSR), a privately operated transit service, brought public transit to the city with the start of horse-drawn streetcar operations May 24, 1875, on Dundas Street.

Fleet
 Single truck horsecars from Ontario Car Company. 
 Large double truck cars from Ottawa Car Company were acquired in 1903 (5) and 1907. 
 5 ex-Cleveland Railway Peter Witts arrived in 1923.
 Ex-Montreal Park & Island Railway cars - non-enclosed cars

Facilities

 Car barns at Dundas and Lyle Streets - since demolished

Routes

 Dundas Street - Eva Street to Wharncliffe Road; north on Wharncliffe to Oxford Street; east on Oxford to Gunn Street
 Adelaide Street - Dundas Street to Central Avenue; along Central to Clarence Street
 Oxford Street - Clarence Street to Adelaide Street
 Ridout Street - Garfield West to Horton Street; along Garfield to Wortley Road to Briscoe Street to Elmwood Avenue; Elmwood to Wharncliffe Highway; to Askin Street to Stanley Road; to Elmwood Avenue to Ridout
 Hamilton Road - Egerton to Maitland Street and Horton Street; Horton Street from Maitland to Thames Street; north of Thames to Stanley Street; along Stanley to Wharncliffe Highway
 Central Avenue - from Adelaide to Clarence Street
 Richmond Street - Horton Street to St James Street; along St James to Wellington Street then Clarence Street to Regent; along Regent to Clarence and then north to Huron Street
 Springbank Park
 South Street - Hamilton Road to Horton Street to Richmond Street or Thames Street; either north to Stanley Street to Ridout north to Dundas Street or Richmond Street to Dundas Street

Ownership

Privately owned from 1875 to 1920, the Ontario Railway and Municipal Board took over control of LSR in 1920.

Demise
The Springbank Park streetcar route ended in 1936, as well as the remaining streetcar routes by 1940. In later years, the city would assume operation of some routes. In 1951, the city assumed control over all routes and formed the London Transportation Commission to operate them. Until 1940, streetcars provided the bulk of the service. The streetcar system was fully converted to buses in late November 1940 (originally planned for the end of 1940, but hastened by a blizzard that damaged trolley wires).

London Transit
In 1974, the LTC adopted its present name, and greatly expanded its service area to cover the newly annexed area in Middlesex County. The system has evolved to feature community bus routes, para-transit services and accessible low floor buses with the express lines as the backbone. In 2003, the LTC opened bus terminals at Argyle and Masonville malls.

Active fleet 

As of 2021, the LTC has 222 transit buses in its fleet. Until recently, London Transit had one of the oldest transit fleets in Ontario, with many buses older than 25 years old. However, with new buses being purchased within the last decade, this has changed. All older model high-floor buses were phased out in 2012, making the LTC fully operated with low-floor accessible buses.

During peak service periods on weekdays there are over 175 buses on the road. Sunday service reduces that number to fewer than 100.

Ridership

After the public transit boom of the 1960s and 1970s, ridership began to slip. At that time almost every transit route was passing through London's downtown area. An attempted building of two downtown malls and the economic recession of the 1990s combined to force the downtown area into serious decline. An economic slump echoed in a parallel drop in ridership, made even worse by the traditional responses of service cuts and fare increases. Between 1987 and 1996, LTC ridership declined by almost 40 percent.

In 1994, the LTC began developing a comprehensive business plan to turn these trends around. Innovations included an overhauling of fare structure, re-thinking routes, bringing buses into mall areas (which would later become true terminal areas), and making standard public transit buses increasingly wheelchair-accessible. Post-secondary students attending the University of Western Ontario and Fanshawe College now receive a subsidised bus pass incorporated into their tuition a program which has become a great success.

Due in large part to these measures, the LTC is currently experiencing a massive increase in ridership, straining current transit resources.

In March 2020 the LTC has experienced decreased ridership due to the COVID-19 Pandemic cutting jobs for drivers and reducing service in areas with low ridership to match the demand. For safety of the drivers and to limit the spread of the coronavirus paying a fare was suspended. Passengers had to board and exit from the rear door while people with accessibility needs can still board and exit at the front of the bus. The London Transit Commission announced that in August front door boarding will continue with new driver barriers installed and a yellow line to help with social distancing requiring passengers to stay behind the yellow line. Passengers are required to enter through the front door and exit through the back door to comply with the social distancing rules and to limit spread of the virus and bringing back fare collection although passengers with accessibility needs can still exit the front door. They also announced that routes serve Western University and Fanshawe College would return and other routes to 90% of its service levels.

Plans

In 2013, London Transit introduced their first semi-express route, Route 90. It initially operated between downtown and Masonville Mall via Richmond, with limited stops. In 2014, Route 90 was extended south to White Oaks Mall via Wellington Road. In addition, Route 91 was added to run on Oxford Street between Wonderland Road and Fanshawe College. In 2015, Route 92 was introduced, running from Masonville Mall to Victoria Hospital, largely via Adelaide Street. In 2019 London Transit introduced 2 more express Route 93 and Route 94. Route 93 operates from Masonville Mall and White Oaks Mall via Western/Wharncliffe and it services as a local route though the Jalna neighbourhood and it replaces Route 26. Route 94 operates via Dundas Street From Western University to Argyle Mall. In 2021 London Transit introduced Route 95 a new peak period semi express bus that will operate between White Oaks Mall and Fanshawe College via Bradley Ave and Highbury Ave as part of the 2021 service changes. Route 95 was originally to begin service in 2021. But due to the COVID-19 pandemic, it has been planned to operate service in September 2022, along with the 2022 service changes.

As of 2019, Shift, London's planned bus rapid transit network is in the design phase. It will be composed of two rapid corridors that meet in a central hub in downtown London. Construction is planned to begin in 2021 and it is estimated that it will be fully completed by 2028

In October 2021 London Transit has partnered with MagusCards to help people for those with autism or other cognitive special needs. It is the key initiatives outlined in the LTC's five-year Accessibility Plan to make the city's transit system more accessible and easier to navigate.

London Transit has also planned to make its bus fleet zero-emission electric which will replace its diesel buses with the new electric buses. The new zero emission buses are expected to roll out in 2024.

2009 transit strike

On November 16, 2009, Amalgamated Transit Union (ATU) Local 741 representing bus drivers and support workers went on strike, the first transit strike for London Transit since 1980. The strike affected all public routes; however, specialized transit services for the disabled continued to operate.

To lessen the inconvenience on university students, the University of Western Ontario (UWO) increased its shuttle bus service. As well, the University Students' Council (USC) secured rental vans driven by volunteers, looping around the city picking up students at key areas and dropping them off at the university. A community-based approach was taken by the USC including a flag-a-ride program and a shuttle service for groceries. David Empey, president of the UWO staff association, was against this volunteer service, calling it "scab labour". He said it was irresponsible to set up a system which replaced the job of striking workers. Despite this, pickets were set up at the university encouraging students to help their cause. "The strike is really inconveniencing people who are paid even less than the drivers," said a third-year Western student. "This shuttle is a good idea. I had hoped they'd put something like this together. We still have to pay for our transit pass [even if there's a strike]".

On December 7, 2009, ATU turned down the LTC's "Final Offer" of 9.3% wage hike over three years. This offer was rejected by 78.5% (322 of 410) of the ATU membership.

The strike ended on December 14, 2009.

Routes

Regular Routes
Buses serving these routes stop at blue bus-stop signs. The bus destination signs display the route number "to" a destination "via" a street or neighbourhood. These routes take effect September 1, 2019.

Note 1A. Buses end Route 1A southbound trips at Commissioners Road and Deveron Crescent, and return northbound via King Edward Street as Route 1B.

Note 1B. Buses end Route 1B southbound trips at Commissioners Road and Deveron Crescent, and return northbound via Pond Mills Road as Route 1A.

Note 2A. Route 2A eastbound buses go to Argyle Mall via Hale and Trafalgar.

Note 2B. Route 2B eastbound buses go to Argyle Mall via Dundas, and go to Bonaventure Drive via Dundas.

Note 4. Route 4A buses travel counter-clockwise at the south end. Route 4B southbound buses travel clockwise at the south end.

Note 5B. Route 5B does not operate after 6:30 PM Monday to Saturday. No Sunday service or on statutory holidays.

Note 10. Route 10 buses serve Masonville Mall Monday to Friday during afternoons and early evening only. Route 10 buses serve Masonville Mall Saturday and Sunday during daytime service only.

Note 13. Route 13 southbound buses arriving at White Oaks Mall depart as Route 13A northbound.

Note 13A. Route 13A southbound buses arriving at White Oaks Mall depart as Route 13 northbound.

Note 17B. Route 17B does not operate after 6:30 PM Monday to Friday and does not operate on weekends and on statutory holidays.

Note 19. Route 19 buses do not serve the Masonville Mall bus terminal. They service the stops at Fanshawe and Richmond.

Note 20. Route 20 buses operate to Beaverbrook and Sarnia Monday to Friday daytime service only. Route 20 buses operate to Capulet Lane only at late night service hours and on weekends.

Note 24. Route 24 does not operate after 9 PM on weekdays, 6 PM on Saturdays and 5:30 PM on Sundays and statutory holidays.

Note 27. This Route links Western University and the Fanshawe College main campus.

Note 28. Route 28 operates during peak periods from 6:30AM to 10:30AM and 2:30PM to 7:00PM on Monday to Fridays

Note 30. Route 30 operates during peak periods and late evening service on Monday and Fridays.

Note 33. Route 33 operates from Monday to Fridays only. No service on weekends or on statutory holidays.

Note 34. Route 34 clockwise buses arriving at Masonville Mall depart as Route 34 counter-clockwise, and vice versa. Route 34 clockwise buses serve Natural Sciences Centre (UWO) but counter-clockwise buses serve Alumni Hall (UWO).

Note 35. Route 35 does not operate after 9 PM on weekdays, 8:30 PM on Saturdays, and 7:30PM on Sundays and statutory holidays.

Note 36. Route 36 operates during the daytime and during late evenings on weekdays only.

Note 37. Route 37 operates during peak periods from 6:30am to 8:30am and from 3:30pm to 5:30pm on Monday to Fridays.

Express Routes
These routes are limited-stop service. Buses on Routes 90, 91, 92, 94 and 95 stop only at express bus stops, which have orange bus-stop signs. Buses on Route 93 provide express service (at orange-signed stops only) north of Wharncliffe & Highview and local service (at blue-signed stops) south of Wharncliffe & Highview.

Community Routes
The following regularly scheduled limited-service routes operate to provide special access to seniors and individuals with impaired mobility to major shopping destinations. They are not designed as an alternative to the paratransit service.

Additional service to Western University and to Fanshawe College

See also
 London Street Railway – the precursor to the London Transit Commission
 Public Transit in Canada

References

External links

 London Transit Commission Website
 Drawings and photos of London Transit buses
 ATU Local 741
 List of London Transit Buses. also History of the buses

Transport in London, Ontario
Transit agencies in Ontario